Milena (Sicilian: Milocca) is a comune (municipality) in the Province of Caltanissetta in the Italian region Sicily, located about  southeast of Palermo and about  west of Caltanissetta.

Formerly known as Milocca, it was the subject of a book, Milocca: A Sicilian Village by Charlotte Gower Chapman, who in 1935 detailed everyday life in the small rural Sicilian town, one of the earliest cultural anthropology studies of a semi-literate people.

Its name  is a form of homage to the Queen Milena of Montenegro, the mother of the Queen Elena, wife of King Victor Emmanuel III of Italy.

International relations

 
Milena is twinned with:
  Aix-les-Bains, France

References

External links 
 Official website

Cities and towns in Sicily